Marcus Paccius Silvanus Quintus Coredius Gallus Gargilius Antiquus (also known as Quintus Coredius Gallus Gargilius Antiquus) was a Roman senator of the 2nd century. He was suffect consul in the nundinium of May to June 119 as the colleague of Quintus Vibius Gallus. Gargilius Antiquus is primarily known through inscriptions.

Biography
Gargilius Antiquus probably had his origins in North Africa. The praenomen of his father (Publius) and his tribe (Quirina) are known from inscriptions. The element "Marcus Paccius" points to a testimonial adoption by an otherwise unknown Paccius; Juvenal (12.99) mentions a rich but childless Paccius, who was pursued by legacy hunters. Gargilius Antiquus was the governor of Arabia Petraea from 116 to 119; in the latter year he was appointed suffect consul. He is attested as present in Rome on 15 October 134, when he was one of the witnesses for the Senatus consultum nundinus slatus Berguensis; later that year he returned to the East to serve as proconsular governor of Asia in 134/135.

Based on an inscription recovered from Dor in 1948, Gargilius Antiquus was known to have been the governor of a province in the eastern part of the Empire, initially supposed to be Syria, between his consulate and his term governing Asia. In November 2016, an inscription in Greek was recovered off the coast of Dor by Haifa University underwater archaeologists, which attests to the fact that Antiquus was the 12th legate of the province of Judea sometime between 120 and 130, in c. 124-125 or in 122-125, prior to the Bar Kokhba revolt.

He is known to have had a son, Lucius Pullaienus Gargilius Antiquus, who was suffect consul around 162.

References

Further reading
 D. Gera and H. M. Cotton, "A Dedication from Dor to a Governor of Syria", in Areas A And C: Introduction and Stratigraphy. Excavations at Dor, Final Report, E. Stern et al. (eds.), Vol. 1A. Qedem Reports 1. (Jerusalem, 1995), pp. 497–500
 E. Dabrowa, "M. Paccius Silvanus Quintus Coredius Gallus Gargilius Antiquus et son cursus honorum", in Nunc de Suebis Dicendum est: Studia Archaeologica et Historica Georgii Kolendo ab Amicis et Discipulis Dicata (Warsaw, 1995), pp. 99–102
 M. Sartre, "Inscriptions inédites de l'Arabie romaine", Syria 50 (1973), pp. 223—233
 E. Dabrowa, "Hadrianic Governors of Syria: A Reapprisal", Zeitschrift fur Papyrologie und Epigraphik 201 (2017), pp. 285-291.
 Gil Gambash and Assaf Yasur-landau, "Governor Of Judea And Syria - A New Dedication From Dor To Gargilius Antiquus", Zeitschrift Für Papyrologie Und Epigraphik 205 (2018), pp. 158–164

External links
 "Marcus Paccius. . . Gargilius Antiquus Confirmed Governor of Judea", Desu Artefacta blog (Last accessed 2 June 2017)

2nd-century Romans
2nd-century Roman governors of Judaea
2nd-century Roman governors of Arabia Petraea
Suffect consuls of Imperial Rome
Roman governors of Arabia Petraea
Roman governors of Judaea
Roman governors of Asia
Paccii
Ancient Roman adoptees